Sivert Stenseth Gussiås (born 18 August 1999) is a Norwegian footballer who plays as a forward for Eliteserien club Sandefjord.

Club career

Molde
Gussiås made his debut for Molde on 18 April 2018 in a 2018 Norwegian Cup game against Træff, a game Molde won 6–1. He signed a professional contract with Molde on 21 August 2018, which expired at the end of the 2019 season.

Strømmen (loan)
On 22 December 2018, Molde announced that Gussiås in the 2019 season would be loaned out to second tier club Strømmen. He got his debut for the club in the season opener on 31 March 2019 in a 1–1 home draw with Ullensaker/Kisa. In the 61st minute of the game, Gussiås scored the equalising goal on a penalty. From 26 May to 16 June, he scored for Strømmen in three consecutive league matches.

Sandefjord
On 8 January 2020, Sandefjord Fotball announced that Gussiås had signed a three-year contract with the club.

Career statistics

Club

References

External links
Profile at Strømmen
Profile at NFF

1999 births
Living people
People from Molde
Norwegian footballers
Molde FK players
Strømmen IF players
Sandefjord Fotball players

Norwegian First Division players
Association football forwards
Sportspeople from Møre og Romsdal